A United Nations Economic Commission for Africa-sponsored meeting held in Addis Ababa, Ethiopia, January 4–8, 1993. Its purpose was to attempt to settle differences between the warring factions of the Somali Civil War. It led to a formal agreement at the Conference on National Reconciliation in Somalia, but factional fighting continued mostly unabated.

Representatives

External links
 The General Agreement signed in Addis Ababa on 8 January 1993
 Addis Ababa Agreement concluded at the first session of the Conference on National Reconciliation in Somalia, 27 March 1993

United Nations operations in Somalia
1993 in Somalia
History of Addis Ababa
20th century in Addis Ababa